The men's 800 metres event at the 1956 Summer Olympics in Melbourne was held on 23, 24, and 26 November 1956. There were a total number of 38 competitors from 24 nations. The maximum number of athletes per nation had been set at 3 since the 1930 Olympic Congress. The event was won by Tom Courtney, the last of a streak of four American victories in the event and the seventh overall United States victory. Derek Johnson's silver put Great Britain back on the podium for the first time since that nation's own four-Games gold streak ended in 1932. Norway received its first men's 800 metres medal with Audun Boysen's bronze.

Summary

This one Olympiad saw the use of starting blocks from a waterfall start for the 800 meters.  All subsequent races have used a standing start in lanes, breaking after the first turn (known as a one turn stagger).  Out of the blocks, Tom Courtney got the edge around the turn, but by the end of the turn Arnie Sowell edged into the lead.  Over the next 150 metres, Sowell opened up as much as a three-metre lead, but Courtney didn't go away. He bided his time for the next lap working his way back to Sowell's shoulder into the final turn and he brought Audun Boysen and Derek Johnson with him. Coming off the final turn it was the two Americans shoulder to shoulder, Sowell on the inside and Courtney on the outside looking like they would fight each other to the finish line like so many domestic races earlier in the season. Johnson had other ideas, squeezing between the two and into daylight.  Again Courtney didn't go away, instead accelerating to keep pace, then with a final burst of speed, passing Johnson 20 metres before the tape to take the gold. Boysen followed Courtney past Sowell to narrowly capture bronze.

Background

This was the 13th appearance of the event, which is one of 12 athletics events to have been held at every Summer Olympics. The only finalist from the 1952 Games to return was fourth-place finisher Gunnar Nielsen of Denmark. In 1955, Audun Boysen of Norway had run under the then-world record time—but in a race in which he finished second, to Roger Moens of Belgium. Moens was injured and did not compete in Melbourne. Boysen faced American favorites Arnie Sowell (AAU champion) and Tom Courtney (U.S. Olympic trials victor) and British favorites Mike Rawson (AAA champion) and Derek Johnson (Commonwealth champion).

Ethiopia, Kenya, Liberia, and Malaya appeared in the event for the first time; German athletes competed as the Unified Team of Germany for the first time. Great Britain and the United States each made their 12th appearance, tied for the most among all nations.

Competition format

The event used the three-round format introduced in 1912. However, the number of semifinals was reduced from 3 to 2 and the final was shrunk from 9 men to 8. There were five first-round heats, each with between 6 and 9 athletes; the top three runners in each heat advanced to the semifinals. There were two semifinals with 7 or 8 athletes each; the top four runners in each semifinal advanced to the eight-man final.

Records

These were the standing world and Olympic records (in minutes) prior to the 1948 Summer Olympics.

Tom Courtney set a new Olympic record with a time of 1:47.7 in the final; the top four men in the final all broke the old record and the fifth-place finisher tied it.

Schedule

All times are Australian Eastern Standard Time (UTC+10)

Results

Heats

Five heats were held, the fastest three of each would qualify for the semifinals.

Heat 1

Heat 2

Heat 3

Heat 4

Heat 5

Semifinals

Two semifinals were held, the fastest four of each would qualify for the final.

Semifinal 1

Nielsen withdrew, "reserving himself for the 1,500 metres."

Semifinal 2

Bailey was "obviously unwell and later scratched from the 1,500 metres."

Final

References

External links
 Official Report
 Results

M
800 metres at the Olympics
Men's events at the 1956 Summer Olympics